The 2019–20 BSC Young Boys season was the club's 95th season in existence and the club's 24th consecutive season in the top flight of Swiss football. In addition to the domestic league, Young Boys participated in this season's editions of the Swiss Cup and the UEFA Champions League. The season covered the period from 1 July 2019 to 30 August 2020.

Players

Current squad

Out on loan

Transfers

In

Out

Pre-season and friendlies

Competitions

Overview

Swiss Super League

League table

Results summary

Results by round

Matches

Swiss Cup

UEFA Champions League

Play-off round

UEFA Europa League

Group stage

Notes

References

External links 
 

BSC Young Boys seasons
Young Boys
Young Boys
Young Boys
Swiss football championship-winning seasons